Agabus obliteratus is a species in the family Dytiscidae ("predaceous diving beetles"), in the order Coleoptera ("beetles").
It is found in North America.

A subspecies of Agabus obliteratus is A. obliteratus nectris Leech, 1942.

References

Further reading
 Arnett, R. H. Jr., and M. C. Thomas. (eds.). (21 December 2000) American Beetles, Volume I: Archostemata, Myxophaga, Adephaga, Polyphaga: Staphyliniformia. CRC Press LLC, Boca Raton, Florida. 
 Arnett, Ross H. (2000). American Insects: A Handbook of the Insects of America North of Mexico. CRC Press.
 D.J. Larson, Y. Alarie, and R.E. Roughley. (2001). Predaceous Diving Beetles (Coleoptera: Dytiscidae) of the Nearctic Region, with emphasis on the fauna of Canada and Alaska. NRC 43253.
 Nilsson, Anders N. (2001). World Catalogue of Insects, volume 3: Dytiscidae (Coleoptera), 395.
 Richard E. White. (1983). Peterson Field Guides: Beetles. Houghton Mifflin Company.
 Webster, Reginald P. (2008). "New predaceous diving beetle (Coleoptera: Dytiscidae) records for New Brunswick and Canada with new distribution information on some rarely collected species". Journal of the Acadian Entomological Society, vol. 4, 38–45.

obliteratus
Beetles described in 1859